Ruyzat-e Sofla (also Romanized as Rūyẕāt-e Soflá; also known as Roveyzāt-e Pā’īn, Roveyẕāt-e Soflá, and Rūyẕāt-e Pā’īn) is a village in Abdoliyeh-ye Sharqi Rural District, in the Central District of Ramshir County, Khuzestan Province, Iran. At the 2006 census, its population was 203, in 33 families.

References 

Populated places in Ramshir County